Himalaya Television, founded in 2010, is a nationwide private television company of Nepal. Himalaya TV has the state-of-art digital broadcasting equipment for production, post-production and broadcasting.

Himalaya Television Network (HTV),The Most watched Television Channel in Nepal, and one of the top premium infotainment Satellite Television channels of the Nation started in the year 2010, has been successfully able to create its identity in a short span of time. Himalaya Television HD has created a benchmark in the history
of Nepal by bringing world-class reality shows like The Voice of
Nepal, The Voice KIDS, Dancing Stars Nepal, Himalaya Roadies,
Nepal Lokstar, Nepal’s Next Top Model and Shark Tank Nepal
as well as popular talk show and series. For Instance
Jeevansathi, Yaksha Prashna, The Game Changer, Banking
Shikshya, Sakkigoni, Halka Ramailo, Juthe and so on

Himalaya TV was bought by onlinekhabar.com, an online news portal of Nepal.

Programs

List of programs broadcast by the Himalaya TV HD 
 Jeevansathi Season Now Season 5 
 The Voice of Nepal Now Season 4
 Himalaya Roadies
 The Game Changer
 The Evening Show at 6
 Halka Ramilo Comedy
 Face 2 Face
 Dancing Stars Nepal
 Sakkigoni
 The Voice Kids
 Samaya Sandayva
 Shark Tank Nepal (Coming soon)
 Nepal lok star
 Himalaya Khas Khabar
 Yekshya Parshna 
 Jutthe 
 Banking Sikcha 
 Golmaal
 Indreni 
 Everest Premier League

The voice of Nepal 
The Voice of Nepal is the Nepalese format of the international TV singing reality series called The Voice. The show usually has four different coaches (judges), which eventually form four different teams after the selection event called the Blind Audition. Each team has to go through the battle round where contestants are paired with one another within the same team and only half of the total selected contestants from the blind audition are selected for the knockout round. During the knockout round, based on The Voice format, only the best and strongest contestants who their respective coach considers the best overall are selected by their coaches. They also have the sole right to do this on their own and take them to the live round (Voting Round). During the live round event, through a series of voting episodes, only one contestant with the most popular vote will advance to the grand finale. The first season of the voice of Nepal was won by CD Vijaya Adhikari from Team Deep, season 2 was won by Ram Limbu from Team Pramod and season 3 was won by Kiran Gajmer from Team Pramod. The Grand Finale of season 1 was held on 14 December 2018 in Qatar stadium, the second season’s Grand finale was held at Taragaon Open Field Chuchchepati Kathmandu on 7 December 2019, and the third season’s Grand Finale was held in The Voice Studio, Dhumbarahi.

The host of the new series is Sushil Nepal (2018 onwards) and Oshin Sitoula (2018), the coaches are Deep Shrestha (season 1 onwards), Sanup Poudel (season 1), Abhaya Subba (season 1), Pramod Kharel (season 1, onwards), Raju Lama (season 2 onwards), Astha Raut (season 2) and Trishna Gurung (season 3). The series is directed by Laxman Paudyal, the former director of season one of Nepal’s first international franchise singing reality show, Nepal Idol.

Himalaya Roadies  
Himalaya Roadies  is a Nepalese reality show. It is part of the MTV Roadies series. The series is broadcast by the Nepalese network Himalaya TV and airs every week for an hour. The participants receive difficult tasks to complete to become a roadie. Only people 18 and over are allowed to compete. The current season (Season 4), with the theme of Season of Survival, follows the existing format of the MTV Roadies wherein the show will be hosted by Raymond Das Shrestha, with special power and responsibility and there will be four gang leaders namely, Anoop Bikram Shahi, Saman Shrestha, Deeya Maskey and Ashish Rana aka Laurey. Priyanka Karki was also seen in 3 episodes of last year’s Roadies as a special guest with some superpower. The series is directed by Simosh Sunwar.

Shark Tank Nepal 

Shark tank is for businesses that are already generating revenue and seeking investment to scale up their business. Entrepreneurs need to present their data related to their business seeking investment in return for a certain percentage of the business’s equity or debt.
How does it work?The applications are open for now. Please follow the link HERE. Once you apply, you will be contacted for further screening upon selection.
Initial screening will be based on the application and reports submitted. The selected businesses will be called for the first round of interviews.The business that will be featured on the show will be shortlisted and the business owners are required to pitch the idea before the investors. The businesses need to offer stakes of their companies against the investment they are seeking.
The sharks can make counter offers and the negotiation can go on until the deal gets cracked. The business owners should be well aware that not all business idea gets the deal. If they could not get the sharks convinced, they will have to return empty-handed.
The sharks, however, can offer to help and support any particular business with or without making an investment.

Nepal Lok Star 
As global TV networks become more accessible, TV audiences become more aware. They start demanding more in terms of quality and content from their TV shows. Nepali TV shows have so far failed to realize this, and hence the core audience is being driven to foreign networks to meet their needs. Nepal Lok Star is an organic solution envisioned to address this problem.

Nepal Lok Star is Nepal’s  first mega-budgeted organic reality TV event that operates without an international franchise. The show was founded to meet the demands of the existent folk-loving audience and present folk genre in a way that is striking to the global audience. All formats and parameters have been set through intense research and collaboration with other franchise reality shows so as to make Nepal Lok Star a unique and desirable platform. The show shall see Nepal’s own folk genre presented with production value like never before.

The Voice of Nepal Kids 
The Voice of Nepal is the Nepalese format of the international TV singing reality series called The Voice. The show usually have four different coaches (judges), which eventually form a four different team after the selection event called the Blind Audition. Each team has to go through the battle round where contestants are paired with one another within the same team and only half of the total selected contestants from the blind audition are selected for the knockout round.

During the knockout round, based on The Voice format, only the best and strongest contestants who their respective coach consider the best overall are selected by their coaches. They also have the sole right to do this on his or her own and take them to the live round (Voting Round). During the live round event, through a series of voting episodes, only one contestant with the most popular vote will advance to the grand finale. The first season of the voice of Nepal was won by CD Vijaya Adhikari from Team Deep, season 2 was won by Ram Limbu from Team Pramod and season 3 was won by Kiran Gajmer from Team Pramod. The Grand Finale of season 1 was held on 14 December 2018 in Quatar stadium, the second season’s Grand finale was held at Taragaon Open Field Chuchchepati Kathmandu on 7 December 2019 and the third season’s Grand Finale was held in The Voice Studio, Dhumbarahi.

Dancing Stars nepal 
Dancing Stars Nepal is an entertainment television series where celebrities from different industries come together and perform with a professional choreographer to compete and win the show.

References

External links
 

Television channels in Nepal
Television channels and stations established in 2010
2010 establishments in Nepal